Bagmati is a Rural municipality located within the Makwanpur District of the Bagmati Province of Nepal.
The municipality spans  of area, with a total population of 30,495 according to a 2011 Nepal census.

On March 10, 2017, the Government of Nepal restructured the local level bodies into 753 new local level structures.
The previous Raigaun, Phaparbari and Betini VDCs were merged to form Bagmati Rural Municipality.
Bagmati is divided into 9 wards, with Phaparbari declared the administrative center of the rural municipality.

Demographics
At the time of the 2011 Nepal census, Bagmati Rural Municipality had a population of 30,587. Of these, 60.4% spoke Tamang, 21.6% Nepali, 7.5% Magar, 5.9% Rai, 2.2% Majhi, 1.2% Pahari, 0.5% Newar, 0.2% Bhojpuri, 0.2% Danuwar, 0.1% Bhujel, 0.1% Maithili and 0.1% other languages as their first language.

In terms of ethnicity/caste, 60.5% were Tamang, 12.4% Magar, 8.3% Rai, 4.7% Majhi, 3.9% Pahari, 3.2% Kami, 2.0% Chhetri, 1.7% Hill Brahmin, 1.6% Newar, 0.7% Damai/Dholi, 0.2% Danuwar, 0.1% Brahmu/Baramo, 0.1% Gharti/Bhujel, 0.1% Sarki and 0.3% others.

In terms of religion, 66.3% were Buddhist, 27.8% Hindu, 3.6% Christian, 2.1% Prakriti and 0.2% others.

References

External links
official website of the rural municipality

Rural municipalities in Makwanpur District
Rural municipalities of Nepal established in 2017